The Jomi Tojikiston (Tajiki: Ҷоми Тоҷикистон),, or Tajikistan Cup is the top knockout football tournament of Tajikistan.

Winners
Previous winners are:

Tajikistan Cup
All finals, winners and finalists.

Results by team

Soviet time

1938 Dinamo Stalinabad
1939 Dinamo Stalinabad
1940 Dinamo Stalinabad
1941 Dinamo Stalinabad
1942 KVAU Dushanbe
1943—1945 No tournament
1946 Dinamo Stalinabad
1947 Hisar Team
1948 Hisar Team
1949 Dinamo Stalinabad
1950 Dinamo Stalinabad
1951 ODO Stalinabad
1952 Dinamo Stalinabad
1953 Dinamo Stalinabad
1954 Profsoyuz Leninabad
1955 Dinamo Stalinabad
1956 Taksobaza Stalinabad
1957 Metallurg Leninabad
1958 Pedagogichesky Institut Leninabad
1959 Dinamo Stalinabad
1960 Pogranichnik Stalinabad
1961 Pedinstitut Dushanbe
1962 Pogranichnik Leninabad
1963 DSA Dushanbe
1964 Kuroma Taboshary
1965 Vashkh Kurgan-Tyube
1966 Volga Dushanbe
1967 Pedinstitut Dushanbe
1968 Stroitel' Kumsangir
1969 Pedinstitut Dushanbe
1970 Kommunalschik Chkalovsk
1971 Dinamo Dushanbe
1972 TPI Dushanbe
1973 TIFK Dushanbe
1974 SKIF Dushanbe
1975 SKIF Dushanbe
1976 SKIF Dushanbe
1977 Volga Dushanbe
1978 Kuroma Taboshar
1979 Metallurg Tursunzade
1980 Chashma Shaartuz
1981 Trikotazhnik Urateppa
1982 Irrigator Dushanbe
1983 Volga Dushanbe
1984 Metallurg Tursunzade
1985 Avtomobilist Kurghanteppa
1986 SKIF Dushanbe
1987 Metallurg Tursunzade
1988 Avtomobilist Kurghanteppa
1989 Metallurg Tursunzade
1990 Volga Dushanbe
1991 Avtomobilist Kurghanteppa

References

External links

 
Football competitions in Tajikistan
National association football cups
Recurring sporting events established in 1938
1938 establishments in the Soviet Union